Cuthonella cocoachroma is a species of sea slug, an aeolid nudibranch, a marine gastropod mollusc in the family Cuthonellidae.

Distribution
This species was described from Duxbury Reef, San Francisco, United States. It has been reported as far north as the Olympic Peninsula, Washington.

References

Cuthonellidae
Gastropods described in 1979
Molluscs of the Pacific Ocean
Fauna of California
Fauna of the Northwestern United States